Kaleli is a village in the Nusaybin District of the Mardin Province. The village was populated by Kurds of the Dasikan tribe and was Yazidi. It was unpopulated as of 2021.

History 
Due to the oppressive the Turkish state, the village saw a large-scale emigration to Europe in from 1985 on. The Yazidis would largely settle in Germany. Prior to the migration, the village had around 130 households of around 500 people but the village was completely left by 1989. Since 2011, many of these families decided to return but were prevented to do so due to Turkish bureaucracy. Feleknas Uca of the HDP took the case to the Turkish Parliament in 2017.

References 

Villages in Nusaybin District
Tur Abdin
Yazidi villages in Turkey
Kurdish settlements in Mardin Province